

S
 SA   - Savannah and Atlanta Railroad; Central of Georgia Railroad
 SAL  - Seaboard Air Line Railway; Seaboard System Railroad; CSX Transportation
 SAMX - Cargill, Inc. (Seaboard Allied Milling Department)
 SAN  - Sandersville Railroad
 SANX - San Angelo Tank Car Line
 SAPT - Savannah Port Terminal Railroad
 SATX - City Public Service Board of San Antonio
 SAUX - Sauvage Gas Company
 SAWX - Sawco, Inc.
 SAZX - Saz Transportation Corporation
 SB   - South Buffalo Railway
 SBC  - Ferrocarril Sonora Baja California
 SBD  - Seaboard System Railroad; CSX Transportation
 SBGX - Industry Financial Corporation
 SBIX - Standard Brands, Inc.
 SBK  - South Brooklyn Railway
 SBLN - Sterling Belt Line Railway
 SBLX - Sunbelt/Chlor/Alkali Partnership
 SBM  - St. Louis, Brownsville and Mexico
 SBVR - South Branch Valley Railroad
 SC   - Sumter and Choctaw Railway
 SCAX - Southern California Regional Rail Authority (Metrolink)
 SCBG - Santa Cruz, Big Trees and Pacific Railway

 SCCX - Shell Oil Company
 SCEX - Southern California Edison
 SCFE - South Central Florida Railroad
 SCFS - Straits Car Ferry Service Corporation
 SCGX - Schuler Grain Company; Eades Commodities
 SCHX - Stauffer Chemical Company
 SCJX - Gulf Oil Products Company; Chevron Phillips Chemical Company
 SCL  - Seaboard Coast Line Railroad; Seaboard System Railroad; CSX Transportation
 SCLX - Spielman & Caddell Leasing 
 SCM  - Strouds Creek and Muddlety Railroad
 SCMX - Shell Oil Company
 SCOX - Scoular Bishop Grain Company
 SCPX - Shell Oil Company
 SCR  - SCR
 SCRW - Seaway Commercial Railway
 SCST - Seaboard Transportation Company (subsidiary of Seaboard Coast Line Railroad)
 SCT  - Sioux City Terminal Railway
 SCTR - South Central Tennessee Railroad
 SCWX - South Carolina Public Service Authority
 SCXF - South Central Florida Express, Inc.
 SCXY - St. Croix Valley Railroad
 SCYX - Farmers Cooperative Association of York, Nebraska
 SDA  - San Diego and Arizona Railway
 SDAE - San Diego and Arizona Eastern Railway
 SDCX - AMAX Chemical Corporation
 SDER - San Diego Electric Railway
 SDEX - Swindell-Dressler Energy Supply Company
 SDIV - San Diego and Imperial Valley Railroad (expired)
 SDIY - San Diego and Imperial Valley Railroad
 SDNX - North County Transit District
 SDPX - South Dakota Soybeen Processors
 SDRX - Sounder Commuter Rail
 SE   - Ferrocarriles Unidos del Sureste
 SECX - South-East Coal Company
 SEIX - Seimax Gas Corporation
 SEMX - Seminole Electric Cooperative
 SEPA - Southeastern Pennsylvania Transportation Authority (SEPTA)
 SEPX - Southwestern Electric Power Company
 SERA - Sierra Railroad
 SERX - ACF Industries (Shippers Car Line Division)
 SFIX - System Fuels, Inc.
 SFLC - Atchison, Topeka and Santa Fe Railway
 SFLR - Shore Fast Line Railroad
 SFPP - Spruce Fall Power and Paper
 SFQ  - Atchison, Topeka and Santa Fe Railway; BNSF Railway End Of Train Devices
 SFRB - Atchison, Topeka and Santa Fe Railway (Santa Fe Refrigerated Despatch)
 SFRC - Atchison, Topeka and Santa Fe Railway (Santa Fe Refrigerated Despatch)
 SFRD - Atchison, Topeka and Santa Fe Railway (Santa Fe Refrigerated Despatch)
 SFRE - Atchison, Topeka and Santa Fe Railway (Santa Fe Refrigerated Despatch)
 SFRP - Atchison, Topeka and Santa Fe Railway (Santa Fe Refrigerated Despatch)
 SFSR - Santa Fe Southern Railway
 SFSX - San Francisco Transportation Services Company
 SFTX - Continental Tank Car Corporation
 SGAX - SGA Leasing Company
 SGCX - Sungas Corporation of Florida
 SGIX - LPG Transportation, Inc.
 SGLR - Seminole Gulf Railway
 SH   - Steelton and Highspire Railroad
 SHPX - American Railcar Leasing, formerly ACF Leasing/Shippers Car Line Division
 SHRX - Kansas City Railroad Museum
 SI   - Spokane International Railroad; Union Pacific Railroad
 SIGX - Southern Indiana Gas and Electric Company
 SIMX - Sierra Bag Company
 SIND - Southern Indiana Railway
 SIRC - Staten Island Railway
 SIRR - Southern Industrial Railroad
 SIRX - Southern Illinois Railcar Corporation
 SJMX - St. Joe Minerals Corporation
 SJRT - St. Johns River Terminal
 SJT  - St. Joseph Terminal Railroad
 SJVR - San Joaquin Valley Railroad
 SKCX - ARCO Chemical Company
 SKNX - Saskatchewan Grain Car Corporation
 SKOL - South Kansas and Oklahoma Railroad
 SKPX - Saskatchewan Grain Car Corporation
 SKTX - Ski Train
 SL   - Salt Lake City Southern Railroad
 SLAW - St. Lawrence Railroad
 SLAX - St. Lawrence Starch Company, Ltd.
 SLC  - San Luis Central Railroad
 SLGG - Sidney and Lowe Railroad
 SLGW - Salt Lake, Garfield and Western Railway
 SLH  - Sugarloaf and Hazelton Railroad
 SLOX - Selox, Inc.
 SLR  - St. Lawrence and Atlantic Railroad
 SLRG - San Luis and Rio Grande Railroad
 SLRX - St. Louis Refrigerator Car Company
 SLSF - St. Louis - San Francisco Railway (Frisco); Burlington Northern Railroad
 SLWC - Stillwater Central Railroad
 SLTX - Slade Transport, Inc.
 SM   - St. Mary's Railroad
 SMA  - San Manuel Arizona Railroad
 SMCX - San Miguel Electric Cooperative
 SMEX - South Mississippi Electric Power Association
 SMMX - St. Mary's Cement Company
 SMPX - Stone Mountain Scenic Railroad
 SMRR - Sisseton Milbank Railroad 
 SMNX - Solvay Minerals, Inc.
 SMRX - Southeastern Railway Museum
 SMV  - Santa Maria Valley Railroad
 SN   - Sacramento Northern Railway
 SNBL - Sioux City and New Orleans Barge Line
 SNCT - Seattle and North Coast Railroad
 SNFX - IND/AG Chemicals, Inc.
 SNHX - IND/AG Chemicals, Inc.
 SNJX - New Jersey Transit RiverLINE work train 
 SOEX - Shell Oil Company
 SOGX - Diamond Shamrock Chemicals Company
 SOIX - Sand Seed Service, Inc.
 SOLX - Solano Rail Car Company
 SOM  - Somerset Railroad
 SOO  - Soo Line Railroad; Canadian Pacific Railway
 SOPR - South Pierce Railroad
 SOR  - Southern Ontario Railway
 SOU  - Southern Railway; Norfolk Southern Railway
 SP   - Southern Pacific Railroad; Union Pacific Railroad
 SPAX - Southeastern Pennsylvania Transportation Authority (SEPTA)
 SPCX - SPC Rail Group LLC
 SPEG - Spencerville and Elgin Railroad
 SPFE - Pacific Fruit Express; Southern Pacific Railroad; Union Pacific Railroad
 SPGX - Suburban Propane
 SPMW - Southern Pacific Railroad; Union Pacific Railroad (maintenance of Way)
 SPQ  - Southern Pacific Railroad; Union Pacific Railroad End Of Train Devices
 SPS  - Spokane, Portland and Seattle Railway; Burlington Northern Railroad
 SPSX - Progress Rail Services
 SPUD - St. Paul Union Depot Company
 SQVR - Sequatchie Valley Railroad
 SRC  - Strasburg Railroad
 SRCX - Sid Richardson Carbon Company
 SRIX - Southern Region Industrial Realty, Inc.; Southwest Rail Industries, Inc.
 SRL  - Swift Refrigerator Lines (expired)
 SRLX - General American Transportation Corporation 
 SRN  - Sabine River and Northern Railroad
 SROX - United States Department of Energy (Savannah River Operations Office)
 SRPX - Salt River Project Agricultural Improvement and Power District
 SRRX - Star Railroad Equipment
 SRY  - Southern Railway of British Columbia
 SS   - Sand Springs Railway
 SSAM - Sault Ste. Marie Bridge Company (subsidiary of Wisconsin Central)
 SSDK - Savannah State Docks Railroad
 SSGX - McMaster Grain Company
 SSH  - South Shore Railroad
 SSEX - Schnitzer Steel Industries
 SSIX - Itel Corporation
 SSW  - St. Louis Southwestern Railway (Cotton Belt); Southern Pacific Railroad; Union Pacific Railroad
 ST   - Springfield Terminal Railway; Boston and Maine Railroad; Pan Am Railways
 STAX - Stauffer Chemical Company; OCI Chemical Corporation
 STCX - Sterling China Company
 STE  - Stockton Terminal and Eastern Railroad
 STER - St. Thomas and Eastern Railway
 STEX - Sterling Chemicals, Inc.
 STLE - St. Louis & Evansville Railroad Co.
 STLX - A. E. Staley
 STMA - St. Maries River Railroad
 STMX - A. E. Staley
 STOX - ACF Industries
 STRC - Stuart Chemical Transportation
 STRT - Stewartstown Railroad
 STRX - St. Regis Paper Company
 STSX - A. E. Staley
 STTX - Trailer Train Company
 STWX - Struthers Wells Corporation
 SULX - Sultran
 SUN  - Sunset Railway
 SUNX - Sun Refining and Marketing Company
 SUR  - State University Railroad
 SVGX - Savage services
 SVI  - Southern Railway of Vancouver Island, E and N Railway
 SVIL - Saltville Railroad
 SW   - Southwestern Railroad
 SWCX - Estech, Inc.
 SWFX - Southwest Forest Industries, Inc.
 SWGX - Southwest Georgia Railroad Excursion Authority/SAM Shortline Excursion Train
 SWIX - Stonewall Industries LLC
 SWLX - Essel Corporation
 SWRX - Richmond Rail Equipment Leasing Company
 SWYX - Stauffer Chemical Company of Wyoming

S